Ballynagaul (its official name) is a Gaeltacht area within the Irish-speaking Gaeltacht na nDéise part of County Waterford. Comprising the townlands of Baile na nGall Mór and Baile na nGall Beag (Ballynagaul More and Ballynagaul Beg), it is located approximately 9.6 kilometres southeast of Dungarvan. The village of Ring is located in the area.

Ballynagaul contains a pub (Tig an Ceoil), a shop, a playground known as 'An Imearlann', a small restaurant, a fishing pier (Cé Bhaile na nGall), and a beach. "Criostal na Rinne", a workshop where hand-cut glassware is made is also located in Baile na nGall.

See also
Munster Irish
Rinn Ó gCuanach CLG
List of towns and villages in Ireland

References

Gaeltacht places in County Waterford
Gaeltacht towns and villages
Fishing communities in Ireland